Tina Turns the Country On! is the debut solo studio album by Tina Turner, released in September 1974 on the United Artists Records. Released while Turner was still a member of the Ike & Tina Turner Revue, it was an attempt by her husband, Ike Turner, to expose her to a wider audience. Although the album did not chart, it earned Turner a Grammy Award nomination in the "Best R&B Vocal Performance, Female" category.

Recording and release 
Tina Turns the Country On! was recorded at Turner's recording studio, Bolic Sound in Inglewood, California. It was produced by Nashville producer Tom Thacker. The album is made up of mostly covers by various country and folk artists, including Kris Kristofferson, Bob Dylan, Olivia Newton-John, James Taylor and Dolly Parton. The track "Bayou Song" is an original song written for Turner by P.J. Morse. There were no singles released from the album.

Tina Turns the Country On! remains unreleased on CD. The album should not be confused with budget CD compilations such as Tina Turner Sings Country, Soul Deep, Country My Way, Good Hearted Woman, Country In My Soul, Stand By Your Man, Country Classics, You Ain't Woman Enough To Take My Man, The Country Side of Tina Turner etc. which feature material from the archives of Bolic Sound.

Critical reception 
Billboard (September 14, 1974): Fine mix of country, folky and soft rock tunes done in Tina's inimitable style. On this effort she flexes her voice from its softest to its usual rough tone and molds it perfectly around each cut. Drawing from a wide range of composers from Dylan to Dolly Parton to Kris Kristofferson to Hank Snow. Ms. Turner should gain easy soul and pop play and possibly some country play. Surprisingly effective are the slow cuts, and Tina proves just as adept an interpreter of other's material as she is a singer of original songs.

Awards and nominations 
The album garnered Turner a Grammy nomination for Best R&B Vocal Performance, Female at the 17th Annual Grammy Awards.

Track listing

Personnel
Tina Turner - vocals, backing vocals
Mark Creamer – electric and acoustic guitar
James Burton – electric guitar
J. D. Maness – steel guitar
Glen Hardin – piano
John Hammond – piano
Joe Lamano – bass guitar
Mike Botts – drums
Tom Scott – saxophone, recorder
Terrance Lane – percussion, sound effects

Production
Tom Thacker – producer
John Horton – engineer
Fred Borkgren – engineer
Steve Waldman – engineer
D. B. Johnson – engineer
David Alexander – photography
Bob Cato – art direction

References

Tina Turner albums
1974 debut albums
United Artists Records albums
Country albums by American artists
Albums recorded at Bolic Sound